Burch v. Louisiana, 441 U.S. 130 (1979), was a case decided by the United States Supreme Court that invalidated a Louisiana statute allowing a conviction upon a nonunanimous verdict from a jury of six for a petty offense.  The statute allowed for conviction if only five jurors agreed, and this was held to be a violation of the Sixth Amendment.

Background
Burch was found guilty of showing obscene films by a nonunanimous six-member jury in the state of Louisiana. The court imposed a suspended prison sentence of two consecutive seven- month terms and fined him $1,000.

Question Before the Court
Does a conviction by a nonunanimous six-member jury in a state criminal trial for a nonpetty offense violate Burch's Sixth Amendment right to trial by jury as applied to the states through the due process clause of the Fourteenth Amendment?

Decision of the Court
Justice Rehnquist cited  Ballew v. Georgia, noting that only two other states in the country allowed for a non-unanimous decision from a non-six person jury in a non-petty offense. This "near uniform judgment of the Nation" gave the Court a "useful guide" in determining constitutionally allowable in jury practices.

References

External links
 

United States Sixth Amendment jury case law
United States Supreme Court cases
United States Supreme Court cases of the Burger Court
1979 in United States case law